Mudgal is a panchayat town in Lingsugur taluk, Raichur district in the Indian state of Karnataka. Mudgal is about 10 miles south-west of Lingsugur.

Mudgal has several inscriptions belonging to the Seuna Yadavas of Devagiri. It is known for its historical heritage and communal harmony. The main attractions here are the remnants of the Mudgal fort and an ancient Roman Catholic church built by the Jesuits before 1557.

There are ancient temples of Aswathhanarayana, Venkatesha, Narasimha and Didderayah.

History

Mudgal's existence dates back to Neolithic era.
Mudgal is also known as Lord Ganesha's teacher. Mudgal is one of the most important places of historical interest. Mudgal or Mudugal has a history dating back to the Seuna Yadavas of Devagiri, several inscriptions of which have been discovered in and around the town.
In 11th century Mudgal was an educational centre for the students of various parts of the country.
In the beginning of the 14th century, it was an important outpost of the Kakatiya kingdom. Ala-ud-din Bahman Shah, after seizing Devagiri, captured Mudgal along with Raichur. Some recent controversy regarding the original name of Mudgal had arisen by many Historians claiming that it was actually called "Al-Madaggal" during the Bahmani Sultanate era meaning "Place which has been agriculturally cultivated" in Arabic since the Bahmani Turks were predominantly Turko-Arab. After the establishment of the Bahmani Dynasty, the Bijapur kings took possession of the western and southern parts of the territory of the Bahmani kingdom including the forts of Raichur and Mudgal.
During 16th century Mudgal was ruled by Vijayanagar Empire.
Many battles were fought between Vijayanagar emperors and Bahmani sultans.

Places of interest

The most important place of interest at Mudgal is the fort. In the construction of the fort at Mudgal, advantage was taken of a hillock on the top of which were built houses of the royalty and a wall with bastions. The outer fortifications of Mudgal cover an area of half a square mile. The outer fort has a wide moat, which is filled with water. The width of the moat varies, being as much as 50 yards at several places. Behind the moat, there is a scarp with a row of bastions and after that, a narrow covered passage and adjoining it the counter scarp with very massive bastions. From the arrangement of the existing fort, it is apparent that the fort was rebuilt after the invention of guns. The courses of masonry at several places are of Hindu style, but the arch-shaped parapet is of Muslim design. The moat and the row of bastions together offer a pleasing view.

In front of the Fateh Darwaza, which faces north, there is a very massive bastion, with a curtain on each side, thus making a barbican for the defence of the fort. Near this barbican is a guard's room with three arched openings towards the north. The barbican has a narrow court with entrances towards the west and north-east, the gates of which are built in the pillar-and-lintel style. In the covered passage of this gateway, there are guards’ rooms on both sides. The massive bastion above referred to has a gun with a Kannada inscription near the muzzle. The gun has long iron pieces in its interior, which have been bound outwardly by hoops.

There is another gateway on the western side, behind the narrow passage of which there is a second gateway with an arch. The walls at this point are cyclopean in construction. There are guards’ rooms on either side of the passage of this gateway also. There is a third gateway to the left of the second, also arched, but the apex, as in the case of the previous one, is filled up with masonry. This gateway is more massive in construction than the other two, the guard's room attached to its passage also being more commodious. There is a mosque near this gateway, which consists of a double-pillared hall, the pillars being of Hindu design. On the opposite side of the road are the remains of the Naubat Khana. On the way to the Bala Hisar is the gunpowder magazine, where, at one end, two compartments have been built for the storage of gunpowder.

Local Food and Cuisine
Food preferences of the local people are similar to the North Karnataka region, but with influences from Hyderabadi, Marathi, South Karnataka and Konkani cuisines due to the vicinity of those cities to Mudgal. Arabian cuisine is important due to ancestry of the Sayyid tribes as well as diaspora who are settled in the Middle East and bring back Arabian culture.

Milk and dairy products are produced, consumed and transported in large quantities due to the common practice of rearing sheep, cattle and buffaloes. Elderly Mudgal people show pride in making dairy products at home as it used to be a symbol of prestige for the host family to show their dairy product manufacturing skills to guests. although this practice is dwindling with the younger generation who are migrating outside of Mudgal.

Meat products such as chicken, fish, mutton and beef are also produced. The mutton of Mudgal is highly reverered due to its succulent taste owing to fresh feed available to livestock. Many local dishes are dairy or meat based.

Jowar, bajra, Indian barley and makai are grown locally and are the staple diet but nowadays wheat and rice are also grown and consumed due to neighboring influences.

Peanuts and sunflowers are also cultivated in large quantities to produce cooking oil, chutney and achaars.

Jaggery is produced in large quantities and exported due to sugarcane and sugarbeet cultivation.

Chilli pepper cultivation is also on a large scale with local varieties of cayenne and paprika. They are used to flavor many local dishes - locals are accustomed to a high chili heat quotient. Many other Indian spices are also cultivated.

Demographics
According to the 2001 census of India, Mudgal had a population of 19,117. Males constitute 51% of the population and females 49%. Mudgal has an average literacy rate of 52%, lower than the national average of 59.5%: male literacy is 62%, and female literacy is 41%.

Transport
Mudgal is well connected by road to Bangalore, Hubli, Hyderabad, Pune, Panaji, Bagalkot and other major cities. The nearest major airport is in Hyderabad.

Long-distance bus routes
Karnataka State Road Transport Corporation (KSRTC) runs a bus service to other cities and villages. There are also various private bus services.

Railways
Raichur is the nearest railway stations to Mudgal. Raichur is served by a major rail line and is well connected by trains to all major parts of India such as Bangalore, Mumbai, Delhi, Chennai, Hyderabad, Ahmedabad, Trivandrum, Kanyakumari, Pune, Bhopal and Agra.

Recently a railway project was inaugurated to connect Wadi Junction railway station in Kalaburagi district to Gadag Junction; as a result Mudgal and Lingsugur will be connected via rail.

Airways
Rajiv Gandhi International Airport, Hyderabad is nearest International Airport from Mudgal and Gulbarga Airport in Gulbarga is the nearest Domestic Airport from Mudgal

See also

 Tourism in North Karnataka
 North Karnataka
 Kudalasangama
 Badami
 Pattadakal
 Aihole
 Mahakuta
 Kuknur
 Mahadeva Temple (Itagi)
 Gajendragad
 Sudi
 Deva Raya II

External links

 Mudgal Fort
 Mudgal Fort
 Mudgal Fort on Google Maps

References

Buildings and structures in Raichur district
Tourist attractions in Karnataka
Forts in Karnataka
Cities and towns in Raichur district
Tourist attractions in Raichur district